Oscar Lindberg (July 5, 1894 in Björknäs, Sweden – October 5, 1977 in Skelleftehamn, Sweden) was a Swedish cross-country skier who competed in the 1924 Winter Olympics.

He came second in the first Vasaloppet in 1922 (after his teammate from IFK Norsjö, Ernst Alm), and won the second race in 1923. In 1924 he finished eighth in the 50 km event.

Cross-country skiing results

Olympic Games

References

1894 births
1977 deaths
People from Norsjö Municipality
Cross-country skiers from Västerbotten County
Swedish male cross-country skiers
Olympic cross-country skiers of Sweden
Cross-country skiers at the 1924 Winter Olympics